Filippo Strozzi may refer to:

Filippo Strozzi the Elder (1428–1491), Italian banker and statesman
Filippo Strozzi the Younger (1489–1538), Italian banker, statesman and military leader
Filippo di Piero Strozzi (1541–1582), Italian military leader, grandson of the latter

See also
 Strozzi family